Steven Beckingham is a British actor and singer who was born on 6 November 1978 in Frimley Green, Surrey, England, United Kingdom. He has appeared in a few films and TV series including Heartbeat and the Doctor Who episode Dalek. He is now an acting teacher at West Linn High School in Oregon.

Biography
Both of his parents were born just outside London and they met each other while serving in the Royal Navy. Both were athletes, in and out of the Navy, his mother a swimmer and father a footballer. After visiting United States in the mid '80s, Beckingham and his family decided to emigrate to the Pacific Northwest. He started his acting career performing in various musicals in Portland, Oregon in the late '90s. He received a BA in Music from Pacific University in Forest Grove, Oregon where he was to eventually solidify his love for acting on stage.

Beckingham's first straight theatre role that hooked him was Sir Andrew Aguecheek in "Twelfth Night", for which he received a National College Theatre Foundation acting nomination. In 2002 he moved with his now wife, Sara, to London and studied at the London Academy of Music and Dramatic Art. Since then he has had the pleasure of acting on stage and screen. Most recently he has been fortunate enough to be involved with the Tony Award-winning and Evening Standard Award-winning Broadway production of "Who's Afraid of Virginia Woolf?" starring Kathleen Turner and Bill Irwin.

He understudied David Harbour in the role of "Nick" at the Apollo Theatre in London's West End and understudied David Furr in the same role on the U.S. National Tour of the production. Beckingham is also an avid composer and singer-songwriter.

Filmography

References
 

Living people
1978 births
Pacific University alumni
People from Frimley
English male singers
English male television actors
English male stage actors
21st-century English singers
21st-century British male singers